Mount Bindo, a mountain on the Great Dividing Range, is located in the Central Tablelands region of New South Wales, Australia.

Nearby towns include the hamlet of Hampton, Jenolan Caves and the town of Oberon. As with nearby Mount Trickett and Shooters Hill, Mount Bindo is a popular destination for 'snow chasers' during the winter months.

Access to the summit
From the town of Oberon, the Duckmaloi Road heads east for  until it meets the Hampton-Jenolan Caves Rd. There is a roadside rest area here on Hampton State Forest. A dry-weather forest road, the Tea Tree Road, turns left here and heads through the pines to the junction with Bindo Boundary Road. Turn left to the summit of Mount Bindo, from where there are fine views over the Megalong Valley, taking in Oberon to the west, Lithgow to the north, Blackheath and the Hydro-Majestic Hotel at Medlow Bath to the east and two towers to the south.

Gallery

See also
 
List of mountains in New South Wales

References

External links
 Relief maps of the area - Provided by NSW Central Ranges Weather - see link below.
 NSW Central Ranges Weather - Local site with weather information and maps etc. for the Oberon Plateau area.
 Blackheath Weather - Another site with snow and general weather information for the area.

Bindo, Mount
Bindo, Mount
Bindo, Mount
Oberon Council